USS PCE-898 was a  for the United States Navy during World War II. She was renamed Okpo (PCEC 55) after being acquired by the South Korean Navy on 1 November 1974.

History
PCE-898 was laid down by Willamette Iron and Steel Works, Portland on 16 December 1942 and launched on 3 August 1943. She was commissioned on 24 January 1945.

After the war, she was transferred to South Korea and renamed Okpo (PCEC 55) on 1 November 1974.

References

1943 ships
PCE-842-class patrol craft